In enzymology, a dTDP-4-dehydro-6-deoxyglucose reductase is an enzyme that catalyzes the chemical reaction

dTDP-D-fucose + NADP+  dTDP-4-dehydro-6-deoxy-D-glucose + NADPH + H+

Thus, the two substrates of this enzyme are dTDP-D-fucose and NADP+, whereas its 3 products are dTDP-4-dehydro-6-deoxy-D-glucose, NADPH, and H+.

This enzyme belongs to the family of oxidoreductases, specifically those acting on the CH-OH group of donor with NAD+ or NADP+ as acceptor. The systematic name of this enzyme class is dTDP-D-fucose:NADP+ oxidoreductase. This enzyme is also called dTDP-4-keto-6-deoxyglucose reductase. This enzyme participates in polyketide sugar unit biosynthesis.

References

 

EC 1.1.1
NADPH-dependent enzymes
Enzymes of unknown structure